Agathe Snow (née Aparru) (born 1976) is an artist based in Long Island, New York. Before moving to Long Island in 2008, she lived and worked in New York City.

Biography 
Snow was born in Corsica and moved to New York at age 11. As an professional artist, she is entirely self-taught. She works in a variety of media and has collaborated with artists including Alex Arcadia, Rita Ackermann, Michael Portnoy and Emily Sunblad. One of her best known endeavours was No Need To Worry, The Apocalypse Has Already Happened… at James Fuentes Gallery in 2007, in which Snow took the starting point of a recently flooded Manhattan as a conceit on which to base a five-week performance and gallery-wide installation, including a sculpture of the belly of a beached whale.

Snow married artist Dash Snow when he was 18 and she was 23 in 2000. Before Dash Snow died on July 13, 2009, according to his obituary in The New York Times, their marriage had ended in divorce.

In 2005, she staged a 24-hour dance party two blocks away from Ground Zero that brought together a generation-defining group of artists from New York's downtown creative scene including Dash Snow, Ryan McGinley, Lizzi Bougatsos and Dan Colen, among many others. “I invited all of my friends,” Snow told Interview Magazine in 2015. “It was a sense of New York City after 9/11—we don’t know what’s going to happen, we’re all downtown in Manhattan, we might as well have fun.” In 2015, on the tenth anniversary of the original event, Snow held a 24-hour dance party at the Guggenheim titled Stamina that featured never-before-seen video footage from the 2005 party that she had edited into a 24-hour-long video, which premiered in real-time over the duration of Stamina.

Snow's entry to the 2008 Whitney Biennial, held from March 9 to March 16 at the Park Avenue Armory annex of the biennial, was "Stamina: Gloria Et Patria," a week-long dance-a-thon.

In 2019 Snow was working with Marianne Vitale on projects including "Double Vision" including paintings and drawings, some made with food items like mustard and coffee grounds.

Selected exhibitions 

2015

Continuum [solo exhibition], Journal Gallery, Brooklyn, New York

Stamina [color video installation; with sound, 24hrs], Solomon R. Guggenheim Museum, New York City, New York

2012

Tout Dit (2D), OHWOW, Los Angeles, California (solo exhibition)

I like it here. Don't you?, Maccarone, New York, New York (solo exhibition)

References

External links 
Morán Morán Gallery website
Agathe Snow on ArtFacts.net
Interview in NY Magazine
Agathe Snow's Works in the Dikeou Collection

1976 births
Living people
People from Corsica
French emigrants to the United States
French artists
American installation artists